Fuat Göztepe (16 June 1912 in İzmir – 1991 in İzmir) was a Turkish footballer, who played for Altay and Göztepe. He was and still is one of the symbolic footballers in the Turkish city of İzmir, along with Vahap Özaltay and Said Altınordu. He was also part of Turkey's squad at the 1936 Summer Olympics, but he did not play in any matches.

References

External links
 

1991 deaths
1912 births
Turkish footballers
Altay S.K. footballers
Göztepe S.K. footballers
Association football forwards